The Bank Notes (Ireland) Act 1920 is an Act of the Parliament of the United Kingdom which removed any obligation for a bank of issue in Ireland go pay, on demand, any of its notes bearing a date before 4 August 1920, except at the head office in Ireland of the bank.

United Kingdom Acts of Parliament 1920
Financial regulation in the United Kingdom
Currency law in the United Kingdom